is a Japanese footballer currently playing as a defender in the Japanese WE League club Tokyo Verdy Beleza and the Japan women's national team.

Career statistics

Club

International

Honours 
Tokyo Verdy Beleza

 Empress's Cup: 2022
 WE League Cup runner-up: 2022–23

Japan U20

 AFC U-19 Women's Championship: 2017
 FIFA U-20 Women's World Cup: 2018

References

1999 births
Living people
Association football people from Osaka Prefecture
Japanese women's footballers
Japan women's international footballers
Women's association football defenders
Nadeshiko League players
Cerezo Osaka Sakai Ladies players
Nippon TV Tokyo Verdy Beleza players
Footballers at the 2020 Summer Olympics
Olympic footballers of Japan